Robert Littell is the name of:
 Robert E. Littell (1936–2014), New Jersey politician
 Robert Littell (author) (born 1935), American writer

See also
Robert Little (disambiguation)